Artie is a masculine given name, usually a diminutive of Arthur. Notable people with the given name include:

People
 Artie Bettles (1891–1971), Australian rules footballer
 Artie Butler (born 1942), American popular music arranger, songwriter and pianist
 Artie Cobb (born 1942), American poker player
 Artie P. Hatzes (born 1957), American astronomer
 Artie Kornfeld (born 1942), American musician, record producer and music executive best known as the music promoter for the Woodstock Festival
 Artie Lange (born 1967), American actor and comedian on The Howard Stern Show and Mad TV
 Artie Malvin (1922–2006), American composer and vocalist on The Crew Chiefs and with Glenn Miller's band
 Artie Pew Jr. (1898–1959), American college football and basketball player
 Artie Shaw (1910–2004), American jazz clarinetist, composer and bandleader
 Artie Simek (1916–1975), American calligrapher best known as a letterer for Marvel Comics
 Artie Smith (born 1970), American former National Football League player
 Artie Thomas (1884–1960), Australian rules footballer
 Artie Wood (1898–1959), Australian rules footballer and coach

Fictional characters
 Artie Abrams, on the FOX television series Glee
 Artie Maddicks, a Marvel Comics character, affiliated with the X-Men
 Artie, the Strongest Man in the World, on the Nickelodeon sitcom The Adventures of Pete and Pete
 Artie Nielsen, on the television series Warehouse 13
 Artie Ziff, on the FOX animated sitcom The Simpsons
 Arthur Pendragon (Shrek), in the animated film Shrek the Third

See also
 Arte Johnson, American comic actor
 Arty (disambiguation)

English-language masculine given names
Hypocorisms